Tone Perčič (born 26 December 1954) is a Slovenian writer and translator.

Perčič was born in Ljubljana in 1954. He studied French and Italian at the University of Ljubljana and worked as a lecturer in Slovene at universities in Leipzig, Berlin, Nottingham and Paris.

He won the Kresnik Award for his novel Izganjalec hudiča in 1995.

Published works
 Pot v nestalnost, short stories, (1981)
 Dante pri Slovencih, a study of Dante in context of Slovenia and Slovene culture (1989)
 Izganjalec hudiča, novel, (1994)
 Harmagedon, novel, (1997)
 In ti boš meni ponoči trkal na vrata, short stories, (1998)
 Prostozidarstvo, a study on Freemasonry, (2000)

References

Writers from Ljubljana
Living people
1954 births
Kresnik Award laureates